The Zemra Lake is a lake in the western edge of the Republic of Kosovo. It is situated between 2,200 and 2,500 metres of elevation above sea level on the northern slopes of Maja e Gusanit, near Maja e Gjeravicës.

See also 
 Geography of Kosovo 
 List of lakes in Kosovo

Notes

References

External links 
 

Lakes of Kosovo
Accursed Mountains